Harry Hartsell (June 29, 1890 – February 14, 1955) was an American football, basketball, and baseball player, coach, and college athletics administrator.  He served as the head football coach at North Carolina State University—renamed from North Carolina College of Agriculture and Mechanic Arts in 1918—for four seasons, in 1917 and again from 1921 to 1923, compiling a record of 16–18–4.  He was also the head basketball coach at NC State for four seasons (1916–1918, 1921–1923), tallying a mark of 34–32, and the head baseball coach at the school for five seasons (1917–1918, 1921–1923), amassing a record of 52–37–4.  Hartsell was born on June 29, 1890, in Asheville, North Carolina.  He died at the age of 64 on February 14, 1955, at a hospital in Charlottesville, Virginia.

Head coaching record

Football

Baseball

See also
 List of college football head coaches with non-consecutive tenure

References

1890 births
1955 deaths
American football ends
American men's basketball players
Baseball shortstops
NC State Wolfpack athletic directors
NC State Wolfpack baseball coaches
NC State Wolfpack baseball players
NC State Wolfpack football coaches
NC State Wolfpack football players
NC State Wolfpack men's basketball coaches
NC State Wolfpack men's basketball players
Sportspeople from Asheville, North Carolina
Coaches of American football from North Carolina
Players of American football from North Carolina
Baseball coaches from North Carolina
Baseball players from North Carolina
Basketball coaches from North Carolina